Paul Cormier may refer to:
 Paul Cormier (basketball)
 Paul Cormier (engineer)